Live from Austin, TX is a live album and video by American country band Asleep at the Wheel, featuring several former members of the Texas Playboys. Recorded at the group's appearance on Austin City Limits on October 14, 1992, it was produced by Cameron Strang, Jay Woods and Gary Briggs, and released on November 14, 2006 by New West Records. Texas Playboys members Leon Rausch, Eldon Shamblin, Herb Remington and Johnny Gimble are featured on the second half of the album.

Reception

In a review of the album for music website AllMusic, Thom Jurek described Live from Austin, TX as "special", writing that "The bandmembers are so relaxed, open, and in the groove here that this stands out among their live recordings." He praised the performances of "Roly Poly", "Corrine, Corrina", "Blues for Dixie" and "Sugar Moon" as highlights of the collection, which he dubbed "a smoking program of rocking, strolling Western swing tunes".

Track listing

Personnel

Asleep at the Wheel
Ray Benson – vocals, guitar
Cindy Cashdollar – Hawaiian steel guitar
David Earl Miller – bass, vocals
Ricky Turpin – fiddle, mandolin, vocals
Tim Alexander – piano, vocals
Michael Francis – saxophone
David Sanger – drums

The Texas Playboys
Leon Rausch – vocals 
Eldon Shamblin – guitar 
Herb Remington – pedal steel guitar 
Johnny Gimble – fiddle and mandolin 

Additional personnel
Cameron Strang – production
Jay Woods – production
Gary Briggs – production, mixing
Billy Lee Myers, Jr. – engineering
David Hough – engineering
Chet Himes – mixing
Jerry Tubbs – mastering

References

External links

Asleep at the Wheel albums
2006 live albums
2006 video albums
New West Records live albums
New West Records video albums